Harold or Harry Johns may refer to:

Harold E. Johns (1915–1998), Canadian medical physicist
Harry Johns, Australian rules footballer
Harold Johns, former vocalist with Black Robot
Harold Johns (artist), cartoonist, assistant to Frank Hampson on Dan Dare